Sealholtz Run is a tributary of the Susquehanna River in Northumberland County, Pennsylvania. The stream is not designated as an impaired waterbody. Its drainage basin is designated as a Warmwater Fishery and a Migratory Fishery.

Course
Sealholtz Run begins in a valley in Lower Augusta Township. It flows west-southwest for several tenths of a mile before turning west-northwest, while the sides of its valley become steeper. After a few tenths of a mile, the stream turns south and then west before turning northwest. A short distance further downstream, it turns west-northwest, and leaves its valley. After a short distance, it crosses Pennsylvania Route 147 and a railroad, and reaches its confluence with the Susquehanna River.

Sealholtz Run joins the Susquehanna River  upriver of its mouth.

Hydrology
Sealholtz Run is not designated as an impaired waterbody. PPL Corporation was once given a National Pollutant Discharge Elimination System permit to discharge stormwater into the stream for construction purposes.

Geography and geology

Sealholtz Run joins the Susquehanna River on the river's left bank.

Watershed
The stream is entirely within the United States Geological Survey quadrangle of Sunbury. Its designated use is for aquatic life.

History
Sealholtz Run was entered into the Geographic Names Information System on August 2, 1979. Its identifier in the Geographic Names Information System is 1187195.

Biology
The drainage basin of Sealholtz Run is designated as a Warmwater Fishery and a Migratory Fishery. The stream is affected by catch and release regulations for bass.

See also
Hallowing Run, next tributary of the Susquehanna River going upriver
Rolling Green Run, next tributary of the Susquehanna River going upriver
List of rivers of Pennsylvania

References

Rivers of Northumberland County, Pennsylvania
Tributaries of the Susquehanna River
Rivers of Pennsylvania